This list of Adjutants General of the United States Army lists the chief administrative officer of the Army, from 1775 to present.

List

References

Further reading

 
Adjutant
Adjutant
Adjutants General of the U.S. Army